Tarzymiechy Drugie  is a village in the administrative district of Gmina Izbica, within Krasnystaw County, Lublin Voivodeship, in eastern Poland.

The village has a population of 360.

References

Tarzymiechy Drugie